California Hot Springs is a census-designated place in Tulare County, California, United States. California Hot Springs has a post office with ZIP code 93207. The population was 37 at the 2010 census.

History
The hot springs for which the town is named were renowned by native Yokuts Indians for their supposed curative properties. Resorts have existed in the area, formerly known as Deer Creek Hot Springs, since the 1880s. The large Hotel Del Venado was built near the hot springs in 1902. A commercial center, swimming pool and therapeutic center were added in the 1920s. The hotel burnt down in 1932, as did the commercial center in 1968. The facility remained abandoned until restorations were undertaken in the mid-1980s.

Geography
According to the United States Census Bureau, the CDP covers an area of 0.7 square miles (1.9 km), all of it land.

Demographics

At the 2010 census California Hot Springs had a population of 37. The racial makeup of California Hot Springs was 34 (91.9%) White, 0 (0.0%) African American, 0 (0.0%) Native American, 1 (2.7%) Asian, 0 (0.0%) Pacific Islander, 0 (0.0%) from other races, and 2 (5.4%) from two or more races. Hispanic or Latino of any race were 3 people (8.1%).

The whole population lived in households, no one lived in non-institutionalized group quarters and no one was institutionalized.

There were 22 households, 1 (4.5%) had children under the age of 18 living in them, 9 (40.9%) were opposite-sex married couples living together, 1 (4.5%) had a female householder with no husband present, 0 (0%) had a male householder with no wife present.  There were 1 (4.5%) unmarried opposite-sex partnerships, and 0 (0%) same-sex married couples or partnerships. 11 households (50.0%) were one person and 2 (9.1%) had someone living alone who was 65 or older. The average household size was 1.68.  There were 10 families (45.5% of households); the average family size was 2.40.

The age distribution was 2 people (5.4%) under the age of 18, 1 people (2.7%) aged 18 to 24, 3 people (8.1%) aged 25 to 44, 17 people (45.9%) aged 45 to 64, and 14 people (37.8%) who were 65 or older.  The median age was 60.5 years. For every 100 females, there were 85.0 males.  For every 100 females age 18 and over, there were 75.0 males.

There were 68 housing units at an average density of 90.9 per square mile, of the occupied units 16 (72.7%) were owner-occupied and 6 (27.3%) were rented. The homeowner vacancy rate was 5.9%; the rental vacancy rate was 0%.  28 people (75.7% of the population) lived in owner-occupied housing units and 9 people (24.3%) lived in rental housing units.

References

Census-designated places in Tulare County, California
Census-designated places in California